The 2021 Tour de Wallonie (known as the Ethias–Tour de Wallonie for sponsorship reasons) was a five-stage men's professional road cycling race mainly held in the Belgian region of Wallonia. It was a 2.Pro race as part of the 2021 UCI Europe Tour and the 2021 UCI ProSeries calendars. It was the forty-eighth edition of the Tour de Wallonie, which started on 20 July and finished on 24 July.

Teams 
Thirteen of the nineteen UCI WorldTeams, seven UCI ProTeams, and five UCI Continental teams made up the twenty-five teams that participated in the race.

UCI WorldTeams

 
 
 
 
 
 
 
 
 
 
 
 
 

UCI ProTeams

 
 
 
 
 
 
 

UCI Continental Teams

Route

Stages

Stage 1 
20 July 2021 — Genappe to Héron,

Stage 2 
21 July 2021 — Verviers to Herve,  Zolder to Zolder, 

Stage 2 was originally due to be cancelled due to the damage and consequences of the 2021 European floods in Wallonia. However, on 20 July, it was announced that the stage would be replaced by a 40-lap criterium on the Circuit Zolder in Limburg.

Stage 3 
22 July 2021 — Plombières Waimes to Érezée,

Stage 4 
23 July 2021 — Neufchâteau to Fleurus,

Stage 5 
24 July 2021 — Dinant to Quaregnon,

Classification leadership table 

 On stage 2, Hugo Hofstetter, who was second in the points classification, wore the yellow jersey, because first-placed Dylan Groenewegen wore the orange jersey as the leader of the general classification. On stage 3, Fabio Jakobsen wore the yellow jersey for the same reason.
 On stage 4, Fabio Jakobsen, who was second in the points classification, wore the yellow jersey, because first-placed Quinn Simmons wore the orange jersey as the leader of the general classification. For the same reason, Stan Dewulf, who was second in the young rider classification, wore the red jersey on stages 4 and 5.

Final classification standings

General classification

Points classification

Mountains classification

Sprints classification

Young rider classification

Team classification

Notes

References

Sources

External links 
  

2021
2021 UCI Europe Tour
2021 UCI ProSeries
2021 in Belgian sport
July 2021 sports events in Belgium